Evandro Braz Guimarães (born 30 July 1973), sometimes known as just Evandro, is a Brazilian professional football coach and former player who played as a midfielder. He is the current head coach of Afogados.

References

External links

1973 births
Living people
Sportspeople from Bahia
Brazilian footballers
Association football midfielders
Atlético Balboa footballers
Maccabi Ahi Nazareth F.C. players
Brazilian expatriate footballers
Brazilian expatriate sportspeople in El Salvador
Brazilian expatriate sportspeople in Israel
Expatriate footballers in El Salvador
Expatriate footballers in Israel
Brazilian football managers
Campeonato Brasileiro Série B managers
Campeonato Brasileiro Série C managers
Campeonato Brasileiro Série D managers
Grêmio Barueri Futebol managers
Sociedade Desportiva Juazeirense managers
Salgueiro Atlético Clube managers
Fluminense de Feira Futebol Clube managers
Brusque Futebol Clube managers
Central Sport Club managers
Associação Olímpica de Itabaiana managers
Associação Atlética de Altos managers
Bolivian Primera División managers
Club Destroyers managers
Brazilian expatriate football managers
Brazilian expatriate sportspeople in Bolivia
Expatriate football managers in Bolivia